This is a list of seasons played by the Portland Timbers in American soccer, from 1975, when the original club first competed in the North American Soccer League, through the most recent completed season. All four incarnations of the Portland Timbers are represented. This list details the club's achievements in all competitions and the top scorers for each season. Records of friendlies and preseason tournaments are not included. Totals include the records and statistics of all four iterations of the club.

Key
Key to competitions

 Major League Soccer (MLS) – The top-flight of soccer in the United States, established in 1996.
 USSF Division 2 Professional League (D2 Pro) – The second division of soccer in the United States for a single season in 2010, now defunct.
 USL First Division (USL-1) – The second division of soccer in the United States from 2005 through 2009.
 A-League – The second division of soccer in the United States from 1995 through 2004, now defunct.
 American Professional Soccer League (APSL) – The second division of soccer in the United States from 1990 through 1996, now defunct.
 Western Soccer League (WSL) – The second division of soccer in the United States from 1985 through 1989, now defunct. The league was previously known as the Western Soccer Alliance (WSA) and the Western Alliance Challenge Series (WACS). The WSL was the third division of American soccer from its founding until its elevation to second division status in 1989.
 North American Soccer League (NASL) – The top-flight of soccer in the United States from 1968 through 1984, now defunct.
 U.S. Open Cup (USOC) – The premier knockout cup competition in US soccer, first contested in 1914.
 CONCACAF Champions League (CCL) – The premier competition in North American soccer since 1962. It went by the name of Champions' Cup until 2008.

Key to colors and symbols

Key to league record
 Season = The year and article of the season
 Div = Division/level on pyramid
 League = League name
 Pld = Games played
 W = Games won
 L = Games lost
 D = Games drawn
 GF = Goals for
 GA = Goals against
 GD = Goal difference
 Pts = Points
 PPG = Points per game
 Conf. = Conference position
 Overall = League position

Key to cup record
 DNE = Did not enter
 DNQ = Did not qualify
 NH = Competition not held or canceled
 QR = Qualifying round
 PR = Preliminary round
 GS = Group stage
 R1 = First round
 R2 = Second round
 R3 = Third round
 R4 = Fourth round
 R5 = Fifth round
 Ro16 = Round of 16
 QF = Quarter-finals
 SF = Semi-finals
 F = Final
 RU = Runners-up
 W = Winners

Seasons

1. Avg. attendance include statistics from league matches only.
2. Top goalscorer(s) includes all goals scored in League, Playoffs, U.S. Open Cup, MLS is Back Tournament, CONCACAF Champions League, FIFA Club World Cup, and other competitive continental matches.
3. Points and PPG have been adjusted from non-traditional to traditional scoring systems for seasons prior to 2003 to more effectively compare historical team performance across seasons.

Interactive chart

Notes

References

 
Portland Timbers
Portland Timbers seasons
Portland Timbers seasons